The Brown B-1 Racer was an American-built small monoplane racing aircraft of the 1930s.

Design and development
The B-1 Racer was built in 1933 by the Brown Aircraft Co. of Montebello, California, which had been founded by Lawrence W. Brown, previously of Clover Field, Santa Monica, California.

The B-1 was designed by Dean Holloway and was intended for competitive flying at the hands of Ralph Bushey.  The diminutive aircraft was a low-winged monoplane with an open single-person cockpit and a fixed tail-skid undercarriage.

Operational history
Ralph Bushey raced the aircraft NR83Y in several prewar competitions in the United States, but the aircraft was damaged in a crash after the engine fell out during the race.  It was rebuilt in 1947 with a removable closed cabin and powered by an  Continental C-85 engine.

The aircraft continued to compete as a "midget racer", named Suzie Jayne.

The B-1 was withdrawn from flying in the late 1940s, and is currently owned by Kermit Weeks. The aircraft was on public display at the Fantasy of Flight in Polk City, Florida, alongside the Brown B-2 replica.

Specifications (as rebuilt in 1947)

References

Notes

Bibliography

 Ogden, Bob. Aviation Museums and Collections of North America, Tonbridge, Kent, UK: Air-Britain (Historians) Ltd., 2007. .

1930s United States sport aircraft
Racing aircraft
B-001
Single-engined tractor aircraft
Low-wing aircraft
Aircraft first flown in 1933